The 2001 Supercoppa Italiana was a match played by 2000–01 Serie A winners Roma and 2000–01 Coppa Italia winners Fiorentina.

The match took place on 19 August 2001 in Stadio Olimpico, Rome and resulted in a 3–0 victory for Roma. 
The goals were scored by Vincent Candela, Vincenzo Montella and Francesco Totti. It was the first time that Roma won this trophy.

Match details

References

Supercoppa Italiana

Supercoppa 2001
Supercoppa 2001
Supercoppa Italiana